Reliance Naval and Engineering Limited (R-Naval), formerly known as Reliance Defence & Engineering Limited and prior to that as Pipavav Shipyard Limited and Pipavav Defence & Offshore Engineering Company Limited  is an Indian shipbuilding and heavy industry company headquartered in Mumbai. The shipyard is located in Pipavav, Gujarat, at a distance of 90 km South of Amreli, 15 km South of Rajula and 140 km South West of Bhavnagar. R-Naval is the first private sector company in India to obtain a license and contract to build warships. Pipavav is the largest shipyard in India.

Reliance Naval and Engineering Limited is under Corporate Insolvency Resolution Process as per the provisions of the Insolvency and Bankruptcy Code w.e.f. January 15, 2020. Its affairs, business and assets are being managed by Mr. Sudip Bhattacharya, Resolution Professional, appointed by NCLT Ahmadabad bench by order dated May 5, 2020.

This is the largest shipyard or ship building facility in India.

History
Pipavav Shipyard was established as a wholly owned subsidiary of SKIL Infrastructure in 1997 at Pipavav, Gujarat. In 2005, with funding from major Indian financial institutions, the company was spun off and registered as Pipavav Shipyard Limited. Pipavav Shipyard Limited raised additional financing from a number of private equity investors in 2007. The company went public in 2009 with listings on the BSE and the NSE.

Pipavav Shipyard is the first corporate shipyard to be granted clearance to build warships and other vessels for the Indian Navy, though the initial licence limits this to up to 5 ships per year.

On March 26, 2015, the Company successfully implemented debt restructuring by raising additional debt of INR 5,500 crore resulting in total debt line in excess of INR 12,000 crore (about US$2 billion). The Company has a market capitalisation ranging between US$700 – 900 million and total enterprise value of USD 2.7 to 2.9 billion.

17.66 per cent of Pipavav was acquired by Reliance Infrastructure Limited on 5 March 2015 in a US$130 mln deal. Subsequently, Reliance Infrastructure launched an open offer to acquire additional shares to control 25.1 per cent of the Company. The open offer has been completed and Reliance Infrastructure now holds 36.5% equity in Pipavav and Anil Ambani has been appointed as the Chairman. The company was renamed to Reliance Defence and Engineering on 3 March 2016 and again renamed to Reliance Naval and Engineering Limited on 6 September 2017.

Facilities
It has access to over 720 meters of exclusive waterfront. This is the largest shipyard in India.

Its dry dock is 640m length and 65m breadth, It can accommodate ships up to 400,000 tonnes DWT. Two cranes with a span of 140 meters & height of 85 meters together capable of handling up to 1200 Ton block and two Level Luffing cranes are erected to service this dry dock. To facilitate afloat fit-out and commissioning of ships, including afloat repairs, a 300–meter long quay, with the capacity for berthing on both sides, adequate draft and serviced by a Level Luffing crane. The entrance of the dry dock also has a 100-meter extension track for the Goliath cranes for unloading heavy machinery and equipment weighing up to 1200 Tons directly from ships and heavy lift barges.

Approximately 4.5 kilometres away from the dry-dock, and located on 95 hectares of land in a Special Economic Zone approved by the Government of India, a block-making facility has been set up for fabrication of hull blocks. By having located the workshops and fabrication facilities in a SEZ away from the dockyard site, it is able to reserve the maximum area of water frontage available at the shipyard site for ship assembly, offshore fabrication and ship repair activities whilst carrying out its fabrication and other similar activities through a SEZ unit. The blocks manufactured at this site are pre-outfitted to the maximum extent. This is done in the ideal working conditions offered by covered fabrication shops. When ready, the blocks are moved to the dock-side for pre-erection of mega/giga-blocks followed by lowering them on the dock floor for final assembly and vessel launching.

Products
Shipbuilding: Bulk Carrier, Platform supply vessel, Barges, Naval ships
Offshore & Engineering: Jackup rigs
Heavy Engineering: Pressure vessels
Machinery: Gantry cranes
Repairs & Conversions: merchant vessels, Naval ships, Oil Platforms, conversion of Mobile Offshore Drilling Units into Mobile Offshore Production Platforms, conversion of Mobile Offshore Production Units into Mobile Offshore Drilling Units

Achievements and orders
From 2011, till January 2015 Pipavav Shipyard delivered 6 new build Panamax Ship of length  225 metres, 5 new build Offshore supply vessels of length 59 metres and 2 new build Barges. This shipyard has repaired and delivered 6 Jackup rigs of Gross Tonnage in between the range of 6000 to 12000 Tonnes, 1 Pipe Laying and Heavy lifting Accommodation Barge, 1 Offshore supply vessel and 1 Coast Guard Ship.

In June 2010, PSL was awarded a  contract to build five offshore patrol vessels for the Indian Navy.

In July 2015, Pipavav shipyard was chosen for a 'Make in India' naval frigate order. The order value exceeds more than USD 3 bn. This order is being termed as the private sector's biggest-ever warship-building project.

On 13 February 2017, Reliance Defence and Engineering Limited (RDEL) has signed the Master Ship Repair Agreement (MSRA) with the US Navy to maintain the vessels of its Seventh Fleet operating in the region, with the company estimating revenues of about Rs 15,000 crore ($2 billion) over next 3 –5 years. The Seventh Fleet’s area of responsibility includes the Western Pacific and Indian Ocean and at any given time there are roughly 140 ships and submarines, 5070 aircraft and approximately 20,000 sailors under its command. Currently, these vessels visit Singapore or Japan for such works.

Joint Venture
On 12 September 2011, it was announced that Pipavav Shipyard entered a joint venture with Mazagon Dock Limited to collaborately build warships and submarines using Pipavav's facilities. The deal will free up the congested order book of Mazagon shipyard and will give Pipavav a much needed boost in defence shipbuilding.
In February, 2014, Pipavav announced a joint venture with Atlas Elektronik to build Heavy Weight Torpedoes.

See also
 List of shipbuilders and shipyards 
 Shipbuilding

References

External links 
 Official site of Reliance Defence and Engineering Limited

Shipbuilding companies of India
Manufacturing companies based in Mumbai
Shipyards of India
Indian companies established in 1997
1997 establishments in Maharashtra
Reliance Group
Companies listed on the National Stock Exchange of India
Companies listed on the Bombay Stock Exchange